is a private university in Higashiosaka, Osaka, Japan. The school was founded in 1965 as a junior women's college. After becoming coeducational in 2001, it became a four-year college in 2003.

External links
 Official website 

Educational institutions established in 1965
Private universities and colleges in Japan
Universities and colleges in Osaka Prefecture
1965 establishments in Japan
Higashiōsaka